Chlorocoris is a genus of stink bugs in the family Pentatomidae. There are about six described species in Chlorocoris.

Species
These six species belong to the genus Chlorocoris:
 Chlorocoris distinctus Signoret, 1851 i c g b
 Chlorocoris flaviviridis Barber, 1914 i c g
 Chlorocoris hebetatus Distant, 1890 i c g b
 Chlorocoris subrugosus Stål, 1872 i c g
 Chlorocoris tau Spinola, 1837 i c g
 Chlorocoris werneri b
Data sources: i = ITIS, c = Catalogue of Life, g = GBIF, b = Bugguide.net

References

Further reading

External links

 

Pentatomidae genera
Pentatomini